The diplomacy of the American Civil War involved the relations of the United States and the Confederate States of America with the major world powers during the American Civil War of 1861–1865. The United States prevented other powers from recognizing the Confederacy, which counted heavily on Britain and France to enter the war on its side to maintain their supply of cotton and to weaken a growing opponent. Every nation was officially neutral throughout the war, and none formally recognized the Confederacy. 

The major nations all recognized that the Confederacy had certain rights as an organized belligerent.  A few nations did take advantage of the war. Spain recaptured its lost colony of the Dominican Republic, although it was lost in 1865. More serious was the war by France, under Emperor Napoleon III, to install Maximilian I of Mexico as a puppet ruler which aimed to negate American influence. France therefore encouraged Britain to join in a policy of mediation, suggesting that both recognize the Confederacy.  Lincoln repeatedly warned that any recognition of the Confederacy was tantamount to a declaration of war. The British textile industry depended on cotton from the South, but it had stocks to keep the mills operating for a year and in any case, the industrialists and workers carried little weight in British politics. Knowing a war would cut off vital shipments of American food, wreak havoc on the British merchant fleet, and cause an invasion of Canada, Britain and its powerful Royal Navy refused to join France.

Historians emphasize that Union diplomacy proved generally effective, with expert diplomats handling numerous crises. British leaders had some sympathy for the Confederacy, but were never willing to risk war with the Union. France was even more sympathetic to the Confederacy, but it was threatened by Prussia and would not make a move without full British cooperation. Confederate diplomats were inept, or as one historian put it, "Poorly chosen diplomats produce poor diplomacy."  Other countries played a minor role. Russia made a show of support of the Union, but its importance has often been exaggerated.

United States
Lincoln's foreign policy was deficient in 1861, and he failed to garner public support in Europe. Diplomats had to explain that the United States was not committed to abolishing slavery, instead appealing to the unconstitutionality of secession. Confederate spokesmen, on the other hand, were much more successful: ignoring slavery and instead focusing on their struggle for liberty, their commitment to free trade, and the essential role of cotton in the European economy. Most European leaders were unimpressed with the Union's legal and constitutional arguments and thought it hypocritical that the U.S. should seek to deny to one of its regions the same sort of  independence it won from Great Britain some eight decades earlier. Furthermore,  since the Union was not committed to ending slavery, it struggled to persuade Europeans (especially Britons) that there was no  moral equivalency between the rebels who established the United States in 1776 and the rebels who established the Confederate States in 1861. Even more importantly, the European aristocracy (the dominant factor in every major country) was "absolutely gleeful in pronouncing the American debacle as proof that the entire experiment in popular government had failed. European government leaders welcomed the fragmentation of the ascendant American Republic."

For decades historians have debated who played the most important roles in shaping Union diplomacy. During the early 20th century, Secretary of State William Seward was seen as an Anglophobe who dominated a weak president. Lincoln's reputation was restored by Jay Monaghan who, in 1945, emphasized Lincoln's quiet effectiveness behind the scenes.  A new study by Norman Ferris in 1976 was a realistic study of Seward's actual programming, emphasizing his leadership role. Lincoln continues to get high marks for his moral leadership in defining the meaning of the conflict in terms of democracy and freedom. Numerous monographs have highlighted the leadership role of Charles Sumner as head of the Senate Foreign Relations committee, and  Charles Francis Adams as minister to the Court of St James's (United Kingdom). Historians have studied Washington's team of hard-working diplomats, financiers and spies across Europe.

Confederate failures

Even the most avid promoters of secession had paid little attention to European affairs prior to 1860. The Confederates had for years uncritically assumed that "cotton is king"—that is, Britain had to support the Confederacy to obtain cotton. However, this assumption was disproven during the American Civil War. Peter Parish has argued that southern intellectual and cultural insularity proved fatal: 

Once the war began, the Confederacy pinned its hopes on military intervention by the United Kingdom and France. However, the UK was not as dependent on Southern cotton as Confederate leaders believed; it had enough stock to last for over a year and developed alternative sources of cotton, most notably in India and Egypt. The UK was unwilling to risk war with the U.S. to acquire more cotton at the risk of losing the large quantities of food imported from the North. Meanwhile, the Confederate national government had lost control of its own foreign policy when cotton planters, factors, and financiers spontaneously decided to embargo shipments of cotton to Europe in early 1861. It was an enormously expensive mistake, depriving the Confederacy of millions of dollars in cash it would desperately need.

The Confederate government sent delegations to Europe but they were ineffective in achieving their diplomatic aims. James Murray Mason went to London and John Slidell traveled to Paris. They were unofficially interviewed, but neither secured official recognition for the Confederacy. However, Confederate purchasing agents in Europe, often working with blockade runners funded by British financiers, were more successful. For example, James Bulloch was the mastermind behind the procurement of warships for the Confederate Navy. Confederate propagandists, especially Henry Hotze and James Williams, were partly effective in mobilizing European public opinion. Hotze acted as a Confederate agent in the UK. His success was based on using liberal arguments of self-determination in favor of national independence, echoing the failed European revolutions of 1848. He also promised that the Confederacy would be a low-tariff nation in contrast to the high-tariff United States. He consistently emphasized that the tragic consequences of cotton shortages for the industrial workers in Britain were caused by the Union blockade of Southern ports.

In March 1862 James Murray Mason made it to England and collaborated with several British politicians to push the government to ignore the Union blockade. Mason and his friends argued that it was only a "paper blockade", not actually enforceable, which by international law would make it illegal. However, most British politicians rejected this interpretation because it was counter to traditional British views on blockades, which Britain saw as one of its most effective naval weapons, as demonstrated by the French Revolutionary and Napoleonic Wars.

Confederate agent Father John B. Bannon was a Catholic priest who traveled to Rome in 1863 in a failed attempt to convince Pope Pius IX to grant diplomatic recognition to the Confederacy. Bannon then moved on to Ireland, where he attempted to mobilize support for the Confederate cause and to neutralize the attempts of Union recruiters to enlist Irishmen into the Union army. Nevertheless, thousands of Irish emigrants volunteered to join the Union.

United Kingdom

The British cabinet made the major decisions for war and peace and played a cautious hand, realizing the risk it would have on trade. Elite opinion in Britain tended to favor the Confederacy, while public opinion tended to favor the United States. Throughout the war, large-scale trade with the United States continued in both directions legally and illegally respectively. The Americans shipped grain to Britain while Britain sent manufactured items and munitions. Immigration continued into the United States as well. British trade with the Confederacy fell by 95%, with only a trickle of cotton going to Britain and hundreds of thousands of munitions slipping in by small blockade runners, most of them owned and operated by British interests.

Prime Minister Lord Palmerston was sympathetic to the Confederacy. Although a professed opponent of the slave trade and slavery, he held a lifelong hostility towards the United States and believed a dissolution of the Union would weaken the United States – and therefore enhance British power – and that the Southern Confederacy "would afford a valuable and extensive market for British manufactures".

Britain issued a proclamation of neutrality on 13 May 1861. The Confederacy was recognized as a belligerent, but it was too premature to recognize the South as a sovereign state since Washington threatened to treat recognition as a hostile action. Britain depended more on American food imports than Confederate cotton, and a war with the U.S. would not be in Britain's economic interest. Palmerston ordered reinforcements sent to the Province of Canada because he was convinced the Union would make peace with the South and then invade Canada. He was very pleased with the Confederate victory at Bull Run in July 1861, but 15 months later he wrote that:

Trent affair: 1861 

A serious diplomatic dispute with the United States erupted over the "Trent Affair" in November 1861. A US Navy ship seized two Confederate diplomats (James Murray Mason and John Slidell) from the British steamer Trent.
Public opinion in the United States celebrated the capture of the rebel emissaries.

However, the US action provoked outrage in Britain and a diplomatic crisis. Palmerston called the action "a declared and gross insult", sent a note insisting on the release of the two diplomats, and ordered 3,000 troops to Canada. In a letter to Queen Victoria on 5 December 1861, he said that if his demands were not met, "Great Britain is in a better state than at any former time to inflict a severe blow upon and to read a lesson to the United States which will not soon be forgotten." In another letter to his Foreign Secretary, he predicted war between Britain and the Union:
 Fortunately, the Queen's husband, Prince Albert, intervened. He worked to have Palmerston's note "toned down" to a demand for an explanation of (and apology) for a mistake.

Despite public approval of the seizure, US President Lincoln recognized that the US could not afford to fight Britain, and that the modified note could be accepted. The US released the prisoners to a British warship. Palmerston was convinced the presence of troops in British North America persuaded the U.S. to acquiesce.

Cotton and the British economy

The British Industrial Revolution was fueled by the expansion of textile production, which in turn were based mostly on cotton imported from the American South. The war cut off supplies, and by 1862, stocks had run out, and imports from Egypt and India could not make up the deficit. There was enormous hardship for the factory owners and especially the unemployed factory workers. The issues facing the British textile industry factored into the debate over intervening on behalf of the Confederacy in order to break the Union blockade and regain access to Southern cotton.

Historians continue to be sharply divided on the question of British public opinion. One school argues that the aristocracy favored the Confederacy, while the abolitionist Union was championed by British liberals and radical spokesmen for the working class. An opposing school argues that many British working men—perhaps a majority—were more sympathetic to the Confederate cause. Finally, a third school emphasizes the complexity of the issue and notes that most Britons did not express an opinion on the matter. Local studies have demonstrated that some towns and neighborhoods took one position, while nearby areas took the opposite. The most detailed study by Richard J. M. Blackett, noting that there was enormous variation across Britain, argues that the working class and religious nonconformists were inclined to support the Union, while support for the Confederacy came mostly from conservatives who were opposed to reform movements inside Britain and from high Church Anglicans.

Humanitarian intervention, 1862
The question of British and French intervention was on the agenda in 1862. Palmerston was especially concerned with the economic crisis in the Lancashire textile mills, as the supply of cotton had largely run out and unemployment was soaring. He seriously considered breaking the Union blockade of Southern ports to obtain the cotton. But by this time the United States Navy was large enough to threaten the British merchant fleet, and of course Canada could be captured easily. A new dimension came when Lincoln announced the Emancipation Proclamation in September 1862. Many British leaders expected an all-out race war to break out in the American South, with so many tens or hundreds of thousands of deaths that humanitarian intervention was called for to stop the threatened bloodshed. Chancellor of the Exchequer William Gladstone opened a cabinet debate over whether Britain should intervene. Gladstone had a favorable image of the Confederacy, and emphasized the humanitarian intervention to stop the staggering death toll, risk of a race war, and failure of the Union to achieve decisive military results.

In rebuttal, Secretary of War Sir George Cornewall Lewis opposed intervention as a high risk proposition that could result in massive losses. Furthermore, Palmerston had other concerns at the same time, including a crisis over King Otto of Greece in which Russia threatened to take advantage of the weaknesses of the Ottoman Empire. The Cabinet decided that the American situation was less urgent than the need to contain Russian expansion, so it rejected intervention. Palmerston rejected Napoleon III of France's proposal for the two powers to arbitrate the war and ignored all further efforts of the Confederacy to gain British recognition.

Blockade runners 
Several British financiers built and operated most of the blockade runners, spending hundreds of millions of pounds on them. They were staffed by sailors and officers on leave from the Royal Navy. When the U.S. Navy captured one of the blockade runners, it sold the ship and cargo as prize of war for the American sailors, then released the crew. During the war, British blockade runners delivered the Confederacy 60% of its weapons, 1/3 of the lead for its bullets, 3/4 of ingredients for its powder, and most of the cloth for its uniforms; such act lengthened the Civil War by two years and cost 400,000 more lives of soldiers and civilians on both sides.

Alabama

A long-term issue was the British shipyard (John Laird and Sons) building two warships for the Confederacy, especially the CSS Alabama, over vehement protests from the United States government. The controversy was resolved after the war in the Treaty of Washington which included the resolution of the Alabama Claims whereby Britain gave the United States $15.5 million after arbitration by an international tribunal for damages caused by British-built warships.

Canada

The Union successfully recruited soldiers in (British) Canada, and local officials tolerated the presence of Confederate agents despite Union protests. These agents planned attacks on U.S. cities and encouraged antiwar sentiment. They actually did stage a small raid in late 1864 on St. Albans, Vermont, where they robbed three banks of $208,000 and killed an American. The raiders escaped back into Canada where the Canadian government arrested them, and then released them.

Slave trade

The British had long pressured the United States to increase their efforts to suppress the transatlantic slave trade, which both nations had abolished in 1807. Pressure from Southern states had neutralized this, but the Lincoln administration was now eager to sign up. In the Lyons–Seward Treaty of 1862, the United States gave Great Britain full authority to crack down on the transatlantic slave trade when carried on by American slave ships.

France

The Second French Empire under Napoleon III remained officially neutral throughout the War and never recognized the Confederate States of America. It did recognize Confederate belligerency. The textile industry needed cotton, and Napoleon III had imperial ambitions in Mexico which could be greatly aided by the Confederacy. The United States had warned that recognition meant war. France was reluctant to act alone without British collaboration, and the British rejected intervention. Emperor Napoleon III realized that a war with the U.S. without allies "would spell disaster" for France. On the advice of its two Foreign Ministers Edouard Thouvenel and Edouard Drouyn de Lhuys, who did not lose sight of the national interest, Napoleon III adopted a cautious attitude and maintained diplomatically correct relations with Washington.   Half the French press favored the Union, while the "imperial" press was more sympathetic to the Confederacy. Public opinion generally ignored the war, showing much interest in Mexico.

Mexico 

In 1861, Mexican conservatives looked to French leader Napoleon III to abolish the Republic led by liberal President Benito Juárez. France favored the Confederacy but did not accord it diplomatic recognition. The French expected that a Confederate victory would facilitate French economic dominance in Mexico. Napoleon helped the Confederacy by shipping urgently needed supplies through the ports of Matamoros, Mexico, and Brownsville, Texas. The Confederacy itself sought closer relationships with Mexico. Juarez turned them down, but the Confederates worked well with local warlords in northern Mexico, and with the French invaders.

Realizing that Washington could not intervene in Mexico as long as the Confederacy controlled Texas, France invaded Mexico in 1861 and installed an Austrian prince Maximilian I of Mexico as its puppet ruler in 1864. Owing to the shared convictions of the democratically elected government of Juárez and Lincoln, Matías Romero, Juárez's minister to Washington, mobilized support in the U.S. Congress, and raised money, soldiers and ammunition in the United States for the war against Maximilian. Washington repeatedly protested France's violation of the Monroe Doctrine.

Once the Union won the war in spring 1865, the U.S. allowed supporters of Juárez to openly purchase weapons and ammunition and issued stronger warnings to Paris. Washington sent general William Tecumseh Sherman with 50,000 combat veterans to the Mexican border to emphasize that time had run out on the French intervention. Napoleon III had no choice but to withdraw his outnumbered army in disgrace. Emperor Maximilian refused exile and was executed by the Mexican government in 1867.

Other countries

Prussia 

Preoccupied with trying to unify the various German states under its banner, Prussia did not participate in the American Civil War. However, several members of the Prussian military served as officers and enlisted men in both armies, just as numerous men who previously immigrated to the United States. Also, official military observers were sent to North America to observe the tactics of both armies, which were later studied by future military leaders of Prussia and then the unified Germany.

Among the effects that Prussia had on the war was the new saddle used by the Union cavalry: Union General George McClellan had studied Prussian saddles and used them as a basis for his McClellan saddle.

Russia 

Russian–Union relations were generally very cooperative. Alone among European powers, Russia offered oratorical support for the Union, largely due to the view that the U.S. served as a counterbalance to the British Empire.

During the winter of 1861–1862, the Imperial Russian Navy sent two fleets to American waters to avoid them getting trapped if a war broke out with Britain and France. Many Americans at the time viewed this as an intervention on behalf of the Union, though some historians deny this. The Alexander Nevsky and the other vessels of the Atlantic squadron stayed in American waters for seven months (September 1863 to June 1864).

In 1863, Russia brutally suppressed a large scale insurrection in Poland during the January Uprising. Many Polish resistance leaders fled the country, and Confederate agents tried but failed to recruit them to come to America and join the Confederacy.

Brazil 

Though nominally neutral, the Empire of Brazil was an unofficial ally of the Confederacy. Emperor Dom Pedro II of Brazil extended privileges to Confederate Navy ships, allowing them to secure supplies in Brazilian ports, which aided the Confederate naval effort of raiding Union vessels in the South Atlantic. The imperial government granted the Confederacy a "belligerent" status, refusing demands by the Union to treat Confederate vessels as "pirates", and ignored diplomatic protests from Washington demanding the forcible removal, by a U.S. warship, of the CSS Sumter at a port in Maranhão on September 6, 1861. Similarly, in 1863 the U.S. ambassador to Brazil, James Watson Webb, exchanged correspondence with the Brazilian Foreign Minister about two Confederate steamers, the Alabama and the Georgia, that had been receiving provisions and repairs at ports in Pernambuco and Bahia, a situation that Webb described as "a gross breach of neutrality". 

After the war, thousands of Confederates emigrated to Brazil on the invitation of Dom Pedro II and subsidized by the Brazilian government.

Austria 

Austria pursued amicable relations with the Union throughout the American Civil War. Reminded of the recent Revolutions of 1848 in the Austrian Empire, Austria opposed revolutionary efforts on principle, which drove them away from the Confederacy. The Austrian Foreign Minister officially stated three days after the outbreak of the American war that "Austria hoped to see the United States reunited since she was not inclined to recognize de facto Governments anywhere." Assuming the war would end shortly, Austria hoped that through a friendly relationship with the Union, the United States would later help them to protect their maritime neutral trading rights, which they feared would be violated in the case of a European war. In 1864, Napoleon III installed Archduke Maximilian of Austria, brother to the Emperor of Austria, as the monarch in French-controlled Mexico. Austria made efforts to separate itself from the French venture, and when Maximilian assumed the throne in Mexico, the Emperor of Austria forced him to renounce his claim to the Austrian crown. These actions satisfied Union diplomats, who disapproved of the European intervention in North America, allowing the United States and Austria to maintain friendly relations through the close of the Civil War.

Ottoman Empire 

The Ottoman Empire strongly favored the Union, who signed a trade deal with the Union and banned Confederate ships from entering from their waters. The Ottoman Empire stood to benefit from the Union's blockade of the Confederate ports, with the cotton industry of the empire (including its tributary states such as Egypt) becoming Europe's largest supplier of cotton as a result.

The Netherlands 

The Lincoln administration looked abroad for places to relocate freed slaves who wanted to leave the United States. It opened U.S. negotiations with the Dutch government regarding African American migration and colonization of the Dutch colony of Suriname in South America. Nothing came of the idea, and after 1864 the idea was dropped.

Kingdom of Italy 

The Italian military leader Giuseppe Garibaldi was one of the most famous people in Europe as a proponent of liberty and republican government; he strongly favored the Union. Early in the war, Washington sent a diplomat to invite him to become an American general. Garibaldi declined the offer because he knew would not be given supreme power over all the armies, and because the United States was not yet committed to abolishing slavery. Historians agree that it was just as well because he was too independent in thought and deed to have worked smoothly with the U.S. government.

Kingdom of Hawaii 

King Kamehameha IV declared Hawaii's neutrality on August 26, 1861. However, many Native Hawaiians and Hawaii-born Americans (mainly descendants of the American missionaries), abroad and in the islands, enlisted in the military regiments of various states in the Union and the Confederacy. Many Hawaiians sympathized with the Union because of Hawaii's ties to New England through its missionaries and the whaling industries, and the ideological opposition of many to the institution of slavery, which the Constitution of 1852 had specifically officially outlawed.

Tokugawa Japan 

During the Civil War, the Union assumed the role of enforcing American trade and extraterritoriality in Japan stemming from the Convention of Kanagawa and subsequent unequal treaties, which at this time the US had the ports of Shimoda, Hakodate, Yokohama, Nagasaki, and Niigata open for US trade. Japan had hoped that the civil war would allow Japan to take back sovereignty of their land if the US was occupied with the civil war. However, the Union sent the USS Wyoming to Japan to protect its interests in the country and fought in the Battle of Shimonoseki Straits during the Shimonoseki campaign against the Chōshū Domain, responding to the Imperial order to expel the "barbarians". The Lincoln administration demonstrated to European powers that the Union had the capability to protect its assets in the middle of a civil war, which further strained Japanese relations with the Union. After the war, the decommissioned ironclad CSS Stonewall would later be given the Imperial Japanese Navy.

Siam 

Prior to the war, King Rama IV offered to send war elephants to the Union for their own military and logistical use. The offer arrived to Lincoln during the civil war, to which Lincoln declined stating that the American climate would not support the domestication of elephants and that the steam engine would suffice in providing the benefits equivalent to a war elephant.

World perspective
Historian Don H. Doyle has argued that the Union victory had a major impact on the course of world history. The Union victory energized popular democratic forces. A Confederate victory, on the other hand, would have meant a new birth of slavery, not freedom. Historian Fergus Bordewich, following Doyle, argues that:

Postwar adjustments

Union relations with Britain (and Canada) were tense; Canada was seen at fault in the St. Albans Raid into Vermont in 1864. The Canadian government captured the Confederates who robbed a bank and killed an American, then released them, angering American opinion. London forced the Canadian Confederation in 1867, in part as a way to meet the American challenge without relying on support from the British military.

The U.S. looked the other way when Irish activists known as Fenians tried and failed badly in an invasion of Canada in 1871. The arbitration of the Alabama Claims in 1872 provided a satisfactory reconciliation; the British paid the United States $15.5 million for the economic damage caused by Confederate warships purchased from it. Congress purchased Alaska from Russia in the Alaska Purchase in 1867, but otherwise rejected proposals for any major expansions, such as the proposal by President Ulysses Grant to acquire Santo Domingo.

See also
 Foreign enlistment in the American Civil War
 History of U.S. foreign policy
 International relations of the Great Powers (1814–1919)
 Timeline of United States diplomatic history

Notes

Works cited

Further reading

General
 Ayers, Edward L. "The American Civil War, Emancipation, and Reconstruction on the World Stage." OAH Magazine of History 20.1 (2006): 54–61.
 Brauer, Kinley J. "The Slavery Problem in the Diplomacy of the American Civil War." Pacific Historical Review 46.3 (1977): 439–469. in JSTOR
 Brauer, Kinley. "Civil War Diplomacy." Encyclopedia of American Foreign Policy (2001): 1:193+; short summary by expert
 Doyle, Don H. "The Global Civil War." in Aaron Sheehan-Dean ed., A Companion to the US Civil War (2014): 1103–1120.
 Ferris, Norman B. Desperate Diplomacy: William H. Seward’s Foreign Policy, 1861 (1976).
 Jones, Howard. Blue & Gray Diplomacy: A History of Union and Confederate Foreign Relations (2010) online
 Monaghan, Jay. Diplomat in Carpet Slippers (1945), Popular study of Lincoln the diplomat online
 Peraino, Kevin. Lincoln in the World: The Making of a Statesman and the Dawn of American Power (2013). online 
 Prior, David M., et al. "Teaching the Civil War Era in Global Context: A Discussion." The Journal of the Civil War Era 5.1 (2015): 97–125. excerpt
 Sexton, Jay. "Civil War Diplomacy." in Aaron Sheehan-Dean ed., A Companion to the US Civil War (2014): 741–762.
 Sexton, Jay. "Toward a synthesis of foreign relations in the Civil War era, 1848–77." American Nineteenth Century History 5.3 (2004): 50–73.
 Sexton, Jay. Debtor diplomacy: finance and American foreign relations in the Civil War era, 1837–1873 (2005).
 Taylor, John M. William Henry Seward: Lincoln's Right Hand (Potomac Books, 1996).
 Van Deusen, Glyndon G. William Henry Seward (1967).
 Warren, Gordon H. Fountain of Discontent: The Trent Affair and Freedom of the Seas (1981).

Confederacy
 Beckert, Sven. "Emancipation and empire: Reconstructing the worldwide web of cotton production in the age of the American Civil War." American Historical Review 109.5 (2004): 1405–1438. in JSTOR
 Blumenthal, Henry. "Confederate diplomacy: Popular notions and international realities." Journal of Southern History 32.2 (1966): 151–171. in JSTOR
 Cullop, Charles P. Confederate Propaganda in Europe, 1861–1865 (1969).
 Crawford, Martin. Old South/New Britain: Cotton, Capitalism, and Anglo-Southern Relations in the Civil War Era (Verlag der Österreichischen Akademie der Wissenschaften, 2007).
 Oates, Stephen B. "Henry Hotze: Confederate Agent Abroad." Historian 27.2 (1965): 131–154. in JSTOR
 Marler, Scott P. "'An Abiding Faith in Cotton': The Merchant Capitalist Community of New Orleans, 1860–1862." Civil War History 54#3 (2008): 247–276. online
  Owsley, Frank Lawrence. King Cotton Diplomacy (1931), The classic history; full text online; also see online review
 Owsley, Frank Lawrence. "The Confederacy and King Cotton: A Study in Economic Coercion," North Carolina Historical Review 6#4 (1929), pp. 371–397 in JSTOR; summary
 Thompson, Samuel Bernard. Confederate purchasing operations abroad (1935).
 Waite, Kevin. West of Slavery: The Southern Dream of a Transcontinental Empire (UNC Press Books, 2021), prewar goals.
 Young, Robert W. Senator James Murray Mason: Defender of the Old South (1998).
 Zvengrowski, Jeffrey. Jefferson Davis, Napoleonic France, and the Nature of Confederate Ideology, 1815–1870 (2019) online review

International perspectives
 American Civil Wars: A Bibliography. A comprehensive bibliography of the United States Civil War's international entanglements and parallel civil strife in the Americas in the 1860s.
 Blumenthal, Henry. "Confederate Diplomacy: Popular Notions and International Realities," Journal of Southern History, Vol. 32, No. 2 (May 1966), pp. 151–171 in JSTOR
 Boyko, John. Blood and Daring: How Canada Fought the American Civil War and Forged a Nation. New York: Alfred A. Knopf, 2013. .
 Cortada, James W. "Spain and the American Civil War: Relations at Mid-century, 1855–1868." Transactions of the American Philosophical Society 70#4 (1980): 1–121.
 Doyle, Don H. The Cause of All Nations: An International History of the American Civil War (2014) online review 
 Fleche, Andre. Revolution of 1861: The American Civil War in the Age of Nationalist Conflict (2012).
 Hyman, Harold Melvin. Heard Round the World; the Impact Abroad of the Civil War. (1969).
 Jones, Howard. Abraham Lincoln and a New Birth of Freedom: The Union and Slavery in the Diplomacy of the Civil War. (U of Nebraska Press, 1999).
 Jordan, Donaldson, and Edwin J. Pratt. Europe and the American Civil War (2nd ed. 1969). 
 Klees, June. "External Threats and Consequences: John Bull Rhetoric in Northern Political Culture during the United States Civil War." Advances in the History of Rhetoric 10#1 (2007): 73–104.
 Mahin, Dean B. One war at a time: the international dimensions of the American Civil War (Potomac Books, 1999).
 May, Robert E., ed. The Union, the Confederacy, and the Atlantic Rim. (2nd ed. 2013).
 Mayers,  Adam. Dixie and the Dominion: Canada, the Confederacy, and the War for the Union (2003) online review
 Saul, Norman E. Distant Friends: The United States and Russia, 1763–1867 (1991).
 * Winks, Robin. Canada and the United States: The Civil War Years (1960).

Britain
 Adams, Ephraim D. Great Britain and the American Civil War (2 vols. 1925), old classic. vol 1 online; also see vol 2 online
 Bennett, John D. The London Confederates: The Officials, Clergy, Businessmen and Journalists Who Backed the American South During the Civil War. (McFarland, 2012) .
 Berwanger, Eugene. The British Foreign Service and the American Civil War (2015).
 Blackett, R. J. M. Divided Hearts: Britain and the American Civil War (2001) online.
 Campbell, Duncan Andrew. English Public Opinion and the American Civil War (2003).
 Crook, D. P. The North, The South, and the Powers, 1861–1865 (1974), focus on Britain and Canada. 
 Duberman, Martin B. Charles Francis Adams, 1807–1886 (1960), U.S. minister in Britain. online
 Ellison, Mary. Support for Secession: Lancashire and the American Civil War (1972); role of cotton mill workers.
 Ferris, Norman B. The Trent Affair: A Diplomatic Crisis (1977).
 Foreman, Amanda. A World on Fire: Britain’s Crucial Role in the American Civil War (2011). online; prizewinning popular history
 Fuller, Howard J. Clad in iron: The American Civil War and the challenge of British naval power (Greenwood, 2008).
 Jones, Howard. Union in Peril: The Crisis Over British Intervention in the Civil War (1992).
 Long, Madeline. In The Shadow of the Alabama: The British Foreign Office and the American Civil War (Naval Institute Press, 2015).
 Merli, Frank J., and David M. Fahey. The Alabama, British Neutrality, and the American Civil War (2004).
 Meyers, Philip E. Caution & Cooperation: The American Civil War in British-American Relations. (2008); A revisionist approach; denies there was much risk of war between the United States and Britain
 Poast, Paul. "Lincoln’s Gamble: Bargaining Failure, British Recognition, and the Start of the American Civil War." (2011) online
 Salisbury, Allen, The Civil War and the American System: America's battle with Britain, 1860–1876 (1978) online
 Sebrell II, Thomas E. Persuading John Bull: Union and Confederate Propaganda in Britain, 1860–1865 (Lexington Books, 2014).
 Sexton, Jay. "Transatlantic financiers and the Civil War." American Nineteenth Century History 2#3 (2001): 29–46.
 Vanauken, Sheldon. The Glittering Illusion: English Sympathy for the Southern Confederacy (Gateway Books, 1989) online

France and Mexico
 Blackburn, George M. "Paris Newspapers and the American Civil War," Illinois Historical Journal (1991)  84#3 pp 177–193. online
 Blumenthal, Henry. A Reappraisal of Franco-American Relations, 1830–1871 (1959)

 Clapp, Margaret. Forgotten First Citizen: John Bigelow (1947) He was the American consul in Paris.
 Carroll, Daniel B. Henri Mercier and the American Civil War (1971); The French minister to Washington, 1860–63.
 Case, Lynn M. and Warren F. Spencer. The United States and France: Civil War Diplomacy. 1970).
 Case, Lynn Marshall. French opinion on war and diplomacy during the Second Empire (1954).
 Hanna, Alfred J., and Kathryn Abbey Hanna. Napoleon III and Mexico: American Triumph over Monarchy (1971).
 Sainlaude, Stève. Le gouvernement impérial et la guerre de Sécession (2011)
 Sainlaude, Stève. La France et la Confédération sudiste. La question de la reconnaissance diplomatique durant la guerre de Sécession (2011)
 Sainlaude,Stève. France and the American Civil War. A diplomatic history (2019)
 Schoonover, Thomas. "Mexican Cotton and the American Civil War." The Americas 30.04 (1974): 429–447.
 Sears, Louis Martin. "A Confederate Diplomat at the Court of Napoleon III," American Historical Review (1921) 26#2  pp. 255–281 in JSTOR on Slidell

American Civil War
History of the foreign relations of the United States